Big Blue Sky may refer to:

 Big Blue Sky (The Northern Pikes album), 1987
 Big Blue Sky (Bebo Norman album), 2001